The Brest ambush was an ambush by Albanian rebels of the NLA, near the village of Brest on 10 March 2001 during the insurgency in Macedonia. Albanian rebels ambushed a Macedonian convoy composed of predominantly ethnic Albanian officers, after they were defeated and forced to withdraw by KFOR troops in the village of Tanuševci.

Ambush 
After the Tanuševci operation a Macedonian police convoy was sent to establish presence near the border to Kosovo and to try to prevent an Albanian insurgency from taking hold in the area, but found itself trapped in an ambush by the NLA. Immediately after the ambush an hour-long battle involving artillery and heavy mortars erupted, after which most of the Macedonian convoy managed to escape. After the firefight the NLA established control in Molino and Brest and the insurgency spread to wider parts of the country.

References 

2001 insurgency in Macedonia